The Tales of Majid is a 1990 Iranian dama miniseries written, produced and directed by Kiumars Pourahmad based on the book of the same name by Houshang Moradi Kermani. Starring Parvindokht Yazdanian and Mehdi Bagherbeigi.

The main story of Majid's stories was written in Kerman and narrates the moments of a child named Majid who lives with his grandmother (Bibi). Later, this TV series was made from it, which moved the story to Isfahan and in the early 1990s Children and adolescents were broadcast on IRIB TV1.

Plot 
The story of the series narrates moments from the life of a teenager named Majid and his grandmother (Bibi). In this series, several stories are shown to the audience, including sea locusts, sports exams, composition bells, camps, and so on.

Cast 
 Parvindokht Yazdanian: as Bibi
 Mehdi Bagherbeigi: as Majid
 Jahanbakhsh Soltani: as The role of school superintendent and two other roles
 Morteza Hosseini: as Mr. Heidari (Teacher of Mathematics and Sports)
Jamshid Sadri: as Headmaster
Mohammad Ali Miandari: as Strict math teacher
Bijan Rafie: as Mr. Rafiei and essay teacher
Hossein Heshmati: as Tailor

References

External links
 

Films based on children's books